"Kelvin" Leong Ian Veng (born 12 September 1968) also known as Kelvin Leong is a Macanese racing driver previously competing in the Macau Touring Car Championship and the World Touring Car Championship, where he made his debut in 2012.

Racing career
Leong began his career in 2008 in the Macau Touring Car Championship, he raced in the championship for up until 2013, winning the championship that year. In 2012 Leong made his World Touring Car Championship debut with Son Veng Racing Team driving a Honda Accord Euro R in the Chinese round of the championship.

Racing record

Complete World Touring Car Championship results
(key) (Races in bold indicate pole position – 1 point awarded just in first race; races in italics indicate fastest lap – 1 point awarded all races; * signifies that driver led race for at least one lap – 1 point given all races)

References

External links
 

1981 births
Living people
World Touring Car Championship drivers
Macau racing drivers
TCR Asia Series drivers